Kel or KEL may refer to:

 Raquel Calderón (born 1991), Chilean singer and actress
 Kei Lun stop, Hong Kong, MTR station code KEL
 Kel, Azad Kashmir, village in Neelam Valley, Azad Kashmir, Pakistan
 Kel Mitchell (born 1978), American actor and comedian
 KEL, the IATA airport code for Kiel Airport in Germany
 KEL Company Kerala Electrical and Allied Engineering Company
 Κel, elimination rate constant in pharmacological clearance
 KEL, a gene in the Kell antigen system
 KEL, a character in the 2020 role-playing video game OMORI

See also
Kell (disambiguation)